Lecithocera pakiaensis is a moth in the family Lecithoceridae. It was described by Kyu-Tek Park in 2009. It is found in Thailand.

The wingspan is 13.5–15 mm. The forewings are orange white, with brownish-orange scales scattered throughout, more dense beyond two-thirds. The discal spot is absent. The hindwings are pale grey.

Etymology
The species name is derived from the type locality.

References

Moths described in 2009
pakiaensis